Pan Junshun (1889 – 1974), was the first Chinese national to be awarded the title Righteous Among the Nations for hiding and sheltering a Ukrainian Jewish girl during the occupation of part of the Soviet Union during World War II.

Life
Pan Jun Shun moved to Russia in 1916 looking for work. He settled in Moscow where he found work as a laborer. As an enthusiastic communist, he decided to stay in the USSR. He married and had two sons while living in Moscow, after which he moved to Kharkov, Ukraine in 1936. His wife died before the outbreak of World War II

His two sons were drafted into the Red Army at the beginning of the war; they never returned home and were presumed to have been killed during the war.

He survived the war and continued to live there until his death in 1974.

Righteous among the Nations
Pan Jun Shun provided shelter and hiding for Ludmilla Genrichovna, a Ukrainian Jewish girl who had escaped from a detention area set up by the occupying German Army. She escaped through the efforts of her mother who realized that her children were likely to be killed as they were being transferred to another town.

References

External links
 Yad Vashem profile for Pan Jun Shun

1889 births
1974 deaths
Chinese communists
Chinese expatriates in the Soviet Union
Chinese Righteous Among the Nations
Jewish Chinese history